Siregar may refer to:

Arifin Siregar (1934–2019), Governor of the Bank Indonesia and Minister of Trade
Bakri Siregar (1922–1994), Indonesian socialist literary critic and writer
Bismar Siregar (1928–2012), former Judge Supreme Supreme Court
Chairuddin Siregar (born 1929), Indonesian footballer
Dedy Jaya Siregar (born 1992), Indonesian footballer
Donny Fernando Siregar, Indonesian footballer
Ersa Siregar (1951–2003), Indonesian journalist working for RCTI
Ghozali Siregar (born 1992), Indonesian professional footballer
Golfrid Siregar (1985–2019), Indonesian environmental activist
Mahendra Siregar (born 1962), deputy foreign minister in Indonesia
Melanchton Siregar (1912–1975), the co-founder and last chairman of the Indonesian Christian Party
Merari Siregar (1896–1941), Indonesian writer
Raja Inal Siregar (1938–2005), governor of North Sumatra
Rendy Siregar (born 1986), Indonesian professional footballer
Sofjan Saury Siregar (1951–2017), Indonesian religious scholar and presidential contender
Sori Siregar (born 1939), Indonesian writer
Zivanna Letisha Siregar (born 1989), Indonesian talk show host, book writer, philanthropist, model

See also
Baharuddin Siregar Stadium, multi-use stadium in Lubuk Pakam, Deli Serdang Regency, North Sumatra, Indonesia